Eba or EBA may refer to:

Economics
 Emergency Banking Act, of the United States Congress
 Euro Banking Association, an industry forum
 Europe Business Assembly, a British vanity award company
 European Banking Authority, a regulatory agency of the European Union
 EBA Clearing, provider of pan-European payment infrastructure

Science
 Epidermolysis bullosa acquisita, a chronic subepidermal blistering disease associated with autoimmunity
 2-Ethoxybenzoic acid
 Evidence based assessment, in psychology
 Expanded bed adsorption, in biochemistry
 Extrastriate body area, a subpart of the extrastriate visual cortex
 Experimental Behavioral Analysis, in behavioral psychology

Sports
 Eastern Basketball Alliance, a semi-professional men's winter basketball league, 1996–2015
 Eastern Basketball Association, a.k.a. Continental Basketball Association
 English BMX Association, part of British Cycling
 Europe Basketball Academy, in Spain
 Liga EBA, a Spanish basketball championship

Transportation
 Eba Station, in Hiroshima, Japan
 Euxton Balshaw Lane railway station, in England
 Federal Railway Authority, in Germany

Education
 Eğitim Bilişim Ağı, electronic educational content network, which founded and operated by Ministry of National Education

Other
 Eba, a Nigerian staple food
 Eba, South Australia, in the Murray Mallee region
 Eba Island, an island in South Australia
 Early Bronze Age
Elite Beat Agents, a 2006 rhythm game
 Emergency brake assist
 European Broadcasting Area
 Everything but Arms, an initiative of the European Union
 Exclusive buyer agent, represents only buyers of real estate
 Mount Eba Station, a pastoral lease in outback South Australia